The Republic of Korea Navy Special Warfare Flotilla (Hanja: 大韓民國 海軍 特殊戰戰團; NAVSPECWARFLOT or WARFLOT) is a special operations force of the Republic of Korea Navy. The WARFLOT is also known as ROKN UDT/SEAL, because the UDT/SEAL is the most publicly known branch of the flotilla.

The UDT/SEALs under WARFLOT are heavily influenced by the United States Navy SEALs, which initially provided funding and expertise in the unit's creation, and still maintain a strong relationship by regularly undertaking joint combined exchange training (JCET) several times a year, utilizing American helicopter and submarine assets, and enrolling students each year in the U.S. Naval Special Warfare programs such as BUD/S and EOD school.

Units
Naval Special Warfare Flotilla - headquartered in Jinhae:
1st Special Missions Battalion (SEAL: SEa, Air, and Land) - Main strike force
Air Operations Squadron
Maritime Operations Squadron
Underwater Operations Squadron
3rd Battalion (CT/Base Protection) - in Donghae attached to 1st Fleet Command
5th Battalion (CT/Base Protection) - in Pyeongtaek attached 2nd Fleet Command
Counter Terrorism Unit (CT/VBSS) - in Jinhae
Explosive Ordnance Disposal Battalion (EOD) - was attached to 1st battalion until 2017
Naval Early Operations Battalion - in Jinhae
Ship Salvage Unit (SSU) - headquartered in Jinhae
1st Rescue Operations Team
2nd Rescue Operations Team
3rd Rescue Operations Team
Deep Sea Diving Team
Support Group

Applicants and selection
The SWF teams take applicants among conscripts, petty officers, and officers. Most petty officers and all conscripts now apply before basic training while officers apply after commissioning (NA, ROTC, or OCS), completion of Surface Warfare Officer School (SWOS), and after they have been assigned to a ship. The BUD/S (Basic Underwater Demolition/SEAL School) selection process is inspired by and similar to the U.S. Navy SEAL program, consisting of physical and mental challenges, such as Hell Week. The completion rate has been known to dip under 10% and usually hovers between 30–40%, leading to manpower problems as the unit continues to expand and has an increasing number of foreign commitments. Between 2010-2012 the completion rate was unusually high at 78.4%, which coincided with the unit's expansion.

Since 2010, most washouts have been retained as support personnel and equipment maintenance staff. Those who survive the first ten weeks are trained in open and closed circuit diving, demolition, land warfare and tactics before receiving the special warfare pin. It also includes learning to fight in close quarters under Multi UDT/SEAL Assaulting Tactics (MUSAT) training.

A SEAL/UDT team is made up of seven soldiers: a point man, a platoon leader, a communication expert, a machine gunner, a grenadier, an assistant leader, and rear security. Basic UDT/SEAL training is 10 weeks long for enlisted men and 20 to 26 weeks long for NCO and officers.

History
Underwater Demolition Unit (UDU) was officially established in 1954. Its parent organization was formed in September, 1948 when the U.S. Army Counter Intelligence Corps set up a secret spy unit in Korea. In 1955 the unit was renamed UDU, short for Underwater Demolitions Unit. Its primary missions were infiltrating into North Korea, kidnapping or assassinating key officials, destroying key structures, resupplying agents, demolishing transportation infrastructures, reconnaissance, wiretapping communications of the North Korean army and attacking military targets in the North.

The SWF (also known in popular culture as the ROKN UDT/SEALs) were involved in reconnaissance missions in North Korea until 1980 when a number of operators were broken away to form the UDU intelligence unit.

In 1968, the Explosives Disposal Unit (EOD) was established and in 1993 the SWF were tasked with standing up a maritime counter-terrorism unit, which up until that point was the responsibility of the Army's 707th Special Mission Group. In the late 1990s, the main focus was on defense of the coast from frequent attempts by the North to infiltrate agents into the South using midget submarines. As of January 1, 2009, the Special Forces were reorganized again, and the Ship Salvage Unit (SSU) was subordinated to the 5th Battalion.

More than 300 UDU personnel were killed in over 200 missions into North Korea from 1948 until 1971, including missions with allies that included the U.S. Central Intelligence Agency. However, only a list of about 150 names has been obtained by UDU, because of a fire at the unit in 1961 which burned all the data.

June 23, 1968 incident
Fifteen South Korean secret agents, a team of three and two teams of six, were sent to the North on a mission to seize a North Korean naval vessel and to kidnap a key officer. But the mission failed because of miscommunication among the South Korean vessels and the commander's misjudgment. It was about 2a.m. when the three South Korean vessels approached the bay from the Yellow Sea and met wired obstacles on the water, which made navigating harder. Without warning, the North Korean Navy started an attack that apparently killed six agents. The other nine South Korean agents returned safely to the South.

1996 Gangneung submarine incident
SWF were involved in the 1996 Gangneung submarine infiltration incident caused by North Korean agents, on a mission to spy on the naval installations in the area and then return. The submarine made a failed attempt to collect the team on the 17th, and returned the following day. The submarine, however, ran aground in the attempt, and all efforts to try to make her free were in vain. A 49-day-long manhunt ensued, from 18 September through 5 November, resulting in the capture or elimination of all the crew and members of the reconnaissance team, except one, who is believed to have made it back to North Korea. Four civilians and 12 ROK soldiers (eight by firefight and four accidental) died; 27 soldiers were wounded.

1998 Sokcho submarine incident
In 1998 the unit was involved in the recovery and search of a North Korean Yono-class submarine that had been accidentally snared in fishing nets near Sokcho, Gangwon Province. A South Korean fishing boat observed several submarine crewmen trying to untangle the submarine from the fishing net. The fishing boat notified the Republic of Korea Navy and a corvette towed the submarine with the crew still inside to a navy base at the port of Donghae. The submarine sank as it was being towed into port, it was unclear if this was as a result of damage or a deliberate scuttling by the crew.

Anti-piracy operations

Since 2009, the SWF have formed the core of the Cheonghae anti-piracy task group deployed to the coast of Somalia.  In the early morning of January 22, 2011, as part of Operation Dawn of Gulf of Aden, 15 SWF operators boarded the 11,000-ton chemical freighter Samho Jewelry which was taken by 13 pirates 6 days prior; 21 sailors had been held hostages. ROKS Choi-Young, a 4600-ton destroyer, dispatched its SWF team at 4:58am along with a Lynx helicopter which then circled the ship and fired machine guns to distract the pirates. The boarding party of 15 SWF killed 8 pirates and captured 5 without taking any casualties after 3 hours of intense firefighting. All 21 hostages were secured, with one hostage suffering a non-fatal gunshot wound to the abdomen.

Sinking of the MV Sewol
SWF provided 114 men that took part in the recovery operation during the sinking of the MV Sewol, during which 304, mostly high school students, perished.

See also
 Republic of Korea Army Special Warfare Command
 707th Special Mission Group
 United States Navy SEALs
 Naval Special Warfare Development Group

References

External links

 Official Site 
 flotilla soldiers knife training

Republic of Korea Navy
Special forces of the Republic of Korea
Naval special forces units and formations
Military units and formations of South Korea in the Vietnam War
Military units and formations established in 1955